Helen Ellis is an American novelist. She has authored two published novels, along with a short story collection and a forthcoming collection of essays.  She is a poker player who competes on the national tournament circuit. Raised in Alabama, she lives with her husband in New York City.

Her first novel, Eating the Cheshire Cat (Scribner: 2001), is a dark comedy written in Southern Gothic fiction style. It tells the story of three girls raised in the South, and the odd, sometimes macabre tribulations they endure.

The Turning: What Curiosity Kills (Powell's Books: 2010), her second novel, is a "teen vampire" story about a southern 16-year-old girl adopted into a wealthy New York City family and centers on shape-shifting, teen romance, and the supernatural.

Her third publication, American Housewife (Doubleday: 2016), is "a sharp, funny, delightfully unhinged collection of stories set in the dark world of domesticity".

A collection of essays entitled Southern Lady Code was published in April 2019.

References

External links
Helen Ellis writes
New York Times New York Times article about the promotion of Ellis' first novel, Eating the Cheshire Cat.
Huffington Post Article about the second novel, The Turning Book: What Curiosity Kills.

American women essayists
American women novelists
Living people
Novelists from Alabama
21st-century American novelists
21st-century American essayists
21st-century American women writers
Writers from Tuscaloosa, Alabama
Year of birth missing (living people)